Shijiazhuang is a town under the administration of Ningwu County, Xinzhou, Shanxi, China. , it has nine villages under its administration.

References 

Township-level divisions of Shanxi
Ningwu County